John Abbott College (French: Collège John Abbott)  is an English-language public college located in Sainte-Anne-de-Bellevue, Quebec, Canada, near the western tip of the Island of Montreal.  John Abbott College is one of eight English public colleges in Quebec. The college primarily serves the Greater Montreal Region. The CEGEP shares grounds with McGill University's Macdonald Campus.

History

The college was accredited in 1970 and opened the next year. It is housed in early 20th-century buildings on a  campus shared with McGill University's Macdonald College. The college is named after John Abbott, prime minister, and former mayor of Montreal who owned a country estate in nearby Senneville. He is most remembered for his role in the Pacific Scandal, the political corruption case which brought down the government of Sir John A. Macdonald in 1873.

The college originally planned to build a new campus in Pointe-Claire next to Fairview Shopping Centre. It "temporarily" moved into buildings on the Macdonald College campus that had been vacated the previous year by McGill's Faculty of Education when it moved to its downtown campus. Additional temporary facilities were rented on Hymus Boulevard in Kirkland, known as the Kirkland Campus. A shuttle bus connected the two campuses. In 1973, the college decided to consolidate the college in Sainte-Anne-de-Bellevue by constructing a new building (subsequently named the Casgrain Centre) and renovating the existing buildings. The Kirkland Campus closed in December 1979, and the construction and renovations in Sainte-Anne were completed in 1981. It remained the last college in Quebec to be renting its campus until 2002, when it bought its buildings from the University. McGill University still owns and operates the majority of the land on campus.

Campus
Housed in century-old renovated buildings in historic Sainte-Anne-de-Bellevue, the college has long been recognized as a prominent landmark in Montreal's West Island community. 
Characterized by tiled roofs and red brick buildings, the college is situated on the shores of Lake Saint-Louis. With its distinctive architecture, trees and rolling green lawns in a charming semi-rural setting, the college's campus has earned a reputation for being one of the most beautiful in the public system. There are a total of ten buildings on campus, all of which are connected to each other in some fashion (with the exception of Brittain Hall).

Brittain Hall
Brittain Hall houses the Continuing Education centre of the college and honours the memory of Dr. W. H. Brittain, former Vice Principal of Macdonald College. It was a men's residence until 1981. Most of the building remains closed due to severe damage caused by a fire in 1981.

Casgrain Centre
The Casgrain Centre houses the sports complex, as well as the theatre and art studios of the college, and is named in honour of Thérèse Casgrain, a Canadian senator who was an advocate for the women's suffrage movement.
The Casgrain building also houses a café, a large student lounge, and the student Agora, an indoor multi-use area for hosting trade fairs, musical performances, movie screenings, exhibitions, and other student-related events and activities.

Herzberg building
The Herzberg building is the central building on campus, housing classrooms and labs for a variety of subjects. The building is also home to essential student services, such as the college library, the Oval coffeehouse, offices for various clubs, the Print Services office, as well as offices for both the director general and the academic dean. Herzberg also houses the Agora, a large open space used for presentations, career fairs and some ceremonies.  
Other student services located in the Herzberg building include the Indigenous Student Resource Centre, Academic Advising, Counselling Services, the Student Employment Centre, Financial Assistance office, Health and Wellness Centre, the Learning Centre, Legal Advisory Services, Registrar's office, the Access Centre, Student Activities and the University and Career Information Centre. 
The building is named in honour of Gerhard Herzberg, a pioneering German Canadian physicist and physical chemist who won the Nobel Prize for Chemistry in 1971.

Hochelaga building
The Hochelaga building houses classrooms for a variety of courses, including history, economics, political science, humanities, philosophy, religion, psychology and sociology, as well as program-specific courses for business administration, commerce, correctional intervention, information and library technologies, and police technology programs.
The building was given the native name for the city of Montreal, in honour of Canada's Indigenous people.

Penfield building
The Penfield building houses classrooms for English, creative arts, French, foreign language and geography courses. It also houses a number of professional programs, including the computer science, engineering technologies, Paramedic care and publication design and hypermedia technology.
The building houses an auditorium, as well as the offices of the Student Union (SUJAC) and the John Abbott College Faculty Association (JACFA). The Pedagogical Computer Centre (PCC) is located on the third floor of the building, home to labs with the necessary materials to conduct courses requiring student computer use.
The building is named after Dr. Wilder Graves Penfield, a famous American-born Canadian neurosurgeon.

Anne-Marie Edward Science building
Opened in 2012, the Anne-Marie Edward Science Building is the location of the Science and Health Technologies departments. It is located between Herzberg and Stewart buildings. The AME building is distinctly modern when compared to the rest of the campus. By comparison, Herzberg has a total of 5 floors, including the basement, while AME has a total of 6 floors. The building contains 33 laboratories and 11 classrooms, along with over 50 staff offices. The building is solely reserved for the school's biology, biopharmaceutical, chemistry, nursing, physics, and prehospital emergency care departments. The building's name commemorates Polytechnique victim and John Abbott College alumna Anne-Marie Edward.

Stewart Hall
Stewart Hall is home to a small number of classrooms, the college bookstore, the college cafeteria, as well as administrative offices and the college boardroom. The building honours the memory of Mr. and Mrs. Walter Stewart, benefactors to Macdonald College.

Other buildings

Stewart East
Connected to the eastern side of the Stewart Apartments, Stewart East is home to classrooms for the dental hygiene program and the college's own dental clinic.

Jones Building
The Jones building was once accessible via the Hochelaga building. However, changes have resulted in the building only being accessible from outdoors. The second floor contains offices used by the football program.

Programs
Pre-university programs usually consist of four semesters (2 years), while career programs usually consist of six (3 years).

Students

Composition
Over 6000 students are enrolled in the Day Division and about 2100 are in the Continuing Education Division. The college primarily serves the western end of the Montreal metropolitan area, although it also has students from other parts of Quebec, the rest of Canada and approximately one hundred international students.

Stewart Apartments
The Stewart Apartments are co-educational residences for full-time students attending John Abbott College. They are the only student residences in the Montreal area that are directly operated by a public English-language college.

Student Union
The Student Union of John Abbott College (SUJAC) promotes and defends students' rights and interests. SUJAC is the official liaison between the students and the college, representing students on committees, organizing student events, and overseeing the allocation of certain student fees for the various clubs that operate throughout the college. SUJAC works on behalf of students and informs them on relevant issues and college matters. The president of SUJAC for the 2020-2021 Academic Year is Emily Thom. The VP Internal of SUJAC this year is Théophile Bourgeois. The VP Academic is Samuel Wong. The VP External is Jonathan Sztainberg. The VP Finance is Molly Gunyon. The VP Communications is John Bedirian.

Student life
The college community offers a variety of extracurricular activities and clubs. The college operates its own radio station, CSKY radio, giving students the opportunity to explore the world of broadcasting. The student newspaper Bandersnatch has been published biweekly since the college's establishment in 1971. John Abbott College Model United Nations Club (JACMUN) hosts an annual Model United Nations conference in the spring, which has been personally recognized by Prime Minister Justin Trudeau as a salient effort to promote political awareness and participation amongst youth.

Athletics
The Casgrain Sport Centre is the home to the John Abbott College Islanders and Lady Islanders who compete in basketball, volleyball, lacrosse, baseball, soccer, rugby, swimming, football, tennis, cross country running and hockey.

The baseball team The Islanders finished second in the 2006 Canadian Intercollegiate Baseball Association's Northern Conference. The men's soccer team John Abbott College Islanders won the semi-finals of the 2000 provincial championship in overtime. The football team won the 2019 Bol D'Or, a thrilling win played during a snow storm. This was the program's first championship since winning the 2002 Bol D'Or. The football program has made 3 straight Bol D'Or appearances and has made it to at least the semi-finals since 2013.

Media events
 John Abbott College students and twins Catherine and Isabelle Bourassa appeared in Playboy's March 1999 college edition.
 In the 8th season of The Amazing Race, teams had to travel to the McGill portion of the campus to engage in curling at Glenfinnan Rink.
 The movie Satan's School for Girls (2000) was shot at the college.
 A five-minute scene was filmed on campus for the feature film Bon Cop, Bad Cop (2006) near the Stewart Hall entrance and inside the lobby of the Herzberg building.
 Most of the interior and exterior shots of the high school in the movie The Secret (2007), starring David Duchovny, were filmed on campus.
 The Spike series "Blue Mountain State" was filmed on campus.
 "Punisher: War Zone" filmed some pyrotechnic stunts in the Britain Hall building.
 Big Wolf on Campus used outside shots of the school.
The movie Race(2016) used outside and inside shots of the school.
 Pet Sematary used outside shots of the school.

Notable alumni
 Anjali Nayar, filmmaker and journalist
 Chris Milo, Canadian football player
 Donovan King, actor
 Elliott Price, radio personality and sports broadcaster
 Geof Isherwood, comic book illustrator
 Glen Murray, Mayor of Winnipeg
 Geoffrey Kelley, politician
 Jade Hassouné, Actor
 L. P. Ladouceur, NFL football player, Dallas Cowboys
 Mark Kelley, CBC reporter
 Michael Soles, CFL fullback
 René Bazinet, actor
 Rene Paredes, CFL kicker, Calgary Stampeders 
 Ruth Taylor, poet
 Sam Roberts, musician
 Serban Ghenea, multi-Grammy Award winning mixing engineer
 Steve Anthony, television personality, voice-over artist
Frances Donald, economist
Notable staff
 David Solway
 Edeet Ravel
 George Springate
 Trevor W. Payne
 Ruth Taylor
 Neil Cameron

See also
 Higher education in Quebec
 List of universities in Quebec
 Canadian Interuniversity Sport
 Canadian government scientific research organizations
 Canadian university scientific research organizations

Other English-language public colleges:
 Champlain
 Dawson College
 Heritage College
 Marianopolis College
 Vanier College

References

External links

Universities and colleges in Montreal
Colleges in Quebec
Quebec CEGEP
English-language universities and colleges in Quebec
Sainte-Anne-de-Bellevue, Quebec